Cran-Gevrier is a former commune in the Haute-Savoie department in the Auvergne-Rhône-Alpes region in south-eastern France. On 1 January 2017, it was merged into the commune Annecy.

Geography
Cran-Gevrier is in the west of Annecy. Part of the town is on a hill (hill of Gevrier). The hamlet of Cran was on the level of the Thiou river. The top of the hill of Gevrier is designated as a natural area.

The Fier forms most of the commune's north-western border.

History
The city draws its origins from two hamlets: Cran and Gevrier. There are two possible origins for each one of these names:
 Cran which means "notch" (permitted the establishment of a road between Boutae (Annecy) and Aquae (Aix-les-Bains), or between two rivers (river Thiou and river Fier).
 Gevrier, the oldest hamlet, got its name either from the Grabriaccus villa, or from the word "guivre", the name of a mythical snake whose role in tales is to keep treasures (one finds a snake rolled up around a sword on the blazon of the lords of Aléry).

The Romans were the first to settle on the hill. A Roman villa and a theatre were built there.

Partner towns
  Piossasco, Italy
  Trenčín, Slovakia 
  Bathgate, Scotland The twinning agreement between Bathgate and Cran-Gevrier was signed in March 2010. Since then, many different projects have been started up, including International Camps for young people (including young Italians from Piossasco) as well as school-to-school projects.

See also
Communes of the Haute-Savoie department

References

Former communes of Haute-Savoie
Populated places disestablished in 2017